Manganui River may refer to the following New Zealand rivers:

Manganui River, Northland
Manganui River, Waikato
Manganui River, Taranaki
Manganui o te Ao River

See also 
 Manganui
 Mangaone River (disambiguation)
 Mangapapa River (disambiguation)